The Poor Millionaire (transliterated “Al-Milyunayr Al-Faqir”) is an Egyptian film released in 1959. It was directed by Hasan el-Saifi and stars comedian Ismail Yassine and singer Fayza Ahmed.

Synopsis
A mayor sends Jaran Effendi (Ismail Yassine) to Cairo out with £E500 to buy a net for his son. However, a thief (Abbas Fares) steals the money, and Jaran is forced to work in a hotel, where he meets and falls in love with the receptionist (Fayza Ahmed).

Songs
Fayza Ahmed performs four songs in the film, all featuring lyrics by Fathi Qura. The most famous number is “يا حلاوتك يا جمالك” (“Oh, Your Sweetness, Oh, Your Beauty”), including a melody by Farid al-Atrash. Duets with Ismail Yassine include “الأسانسير” (“Elevator,” with a melody by Abdel Aziz Mahmoud) and “أنا ح تجنن” (“I’m Going Crazy,” composed by Mounir Mourad). Finally, she sings another solo number entitled “غنت أغنية عشان بحبك” (“I Sang a Song Because I Loved You”), with music by Baligh Hamdi.

External links and bibliography
 IMDb page
 El Cinema page
 

Egyptian comedy films
1959 films